Veitastrond is a small village in the western part of the municipality of Luster in Vestland county, Norway. It is located near the Jostedalsbreen glacier, and Jostedalsbreen National Park surrounds the village on three sides. Veitastrond is located at the northern end of an isolated valley.

The village has 123 inhabitants who share a small shop, a school (9 pupils), and Veitastrond Chapel. The economy is primarily based on agriculture.  The Storelvi river passes by the village before emptying into the long lake Veitastrondsvatnet.

Historically, Veitastrond was part of the municipality of Hafslo from 1838 until 1 January 1963 when Hafslo municipality merged into Luster municipality.

The former Sogndal-player Kurt Heggestad hails from Veitastrond.

References

Villages in Vestland
Luster, Norway